Barend may refer to:

 Barend, a common Dutch given name
 Barend (surname)

See also
 Berend
 Behrendt